Bump and Grind or bump-and-grind may refer to one of the following:

Types of dance and music
 Bump and grind (dance style)
 Music, and occasionally dance, associated with striptease

Musical works

Albums
 Bump 'n' Grind, a 1973  album by Jackson Heights, or the title track
 Bump 'n' Grind, a 1992 album by The 69 Eyes 
 Bump 'n' Grind, a compilation album by Marc Bolan

Songs
 "Bump n' Grind" (R. Kelly song)", 1993
 "Bump 'n' Grind (I Am Feeling Hot Tonight)", a 2000 song by M-Dubs
 "Bump and Grind", a song by David Lee Roth from the 1986 album Eat 'Em and Smile 
 "Bump and Grind", a song by Wendy O. Williams from the 1984 album WOW